Carnival in White is a 1952 West German comedy film directed by Hans Albin and Harry R. Sokal, starring Adrian Hoven, Hannelore Bollmann and Lucie Englisch. It was made at the Bavaria Studios in Munich and on location at the Swiss resort town St. Moritz. The film's sets were designed by Ernst H. Albrecht.

Synopsis
A young engineer has plans to construct a new ski jump that will help boost tourism in the Alpine ski resort. He manages to secure the financial backing of a man who had emigrated to the United States many years earlier and is now a great success. However the engineer's involvement with his daughter Peggy provokes the jealousy of his fiancée Annelies.

Cast
 Adrian Hoven as Hans Brugger
 Hannelore Bollmann as Annelies Seethaler
 Lucie Englisch as Ludmilla Möller
 Charlotte Kerr as Peggy Swenson
 Walter Riml as Hein Möller
 Peter W. Staub as Fietje Schwedler
 Franz Muxeneder as Toni
 Alfred Pongratz as Holzbichler
 Beppo Brem as Wastl
 Bum Krüger as Dr. Schlauch
 Ernst Schönle as Grauhuber

References

Bibliography 
 Hans-Michael Bock and Tim Bergfelder. The Concise Cinegraph: An Encyclopedia of German Cinema. Berghahn Books, 2009.

External links 
 

1952 films
1952 comedy films
German comedy films
West German films
1950s German-language films
Films directed by Hans Albin
Films directed by Harry R. Sokal
Skiing films
Films set in the Alps
German black-and-white films
1950s German films
Films shot at Bavaria Studios
Films shot in Switzerland